Jane de Wet is a South African actress and dancer.

Personal life
De Wet is from Somerset West, Western Cape. She first discovered performing arts as a dancer in a recital at De Hoop Primary School. She matriculated at Parel Vallei High School and went on to graduate with a Bachelor of Communications in Management Sciences from Stellenbosch University in 2017.

Career
De Wet began her career on stage and was named Most Promising Actress at the 2012 ATKV Tienertoneelfees. In 2014, she won Best Actress at ATKV Tienertoneelfees, Best Actress at Durbanville Tienertoneelfees, and Best Actress at Fraserburg Logan Toneelfees.

De Wet starred as Alexis "Lexi" Summerveld in the 2019 Showmax mystery series The Girl from St. Agnes. She made her film debut that year with a minor role in Moffie and as Marthella Steencamp in Griekwastad. For the latter, she won Most Promising Young Talent at the 2020 kykNET Silver Screen Film Festival and received a nomination for Best Supporting Actress in a Feature Film at the 2021 South African Film and Television Awards.

In 2020, de Wet appeared in the Vuzu series Still Breathing as well as the television films Rage and Parable. In 2021, she joined the cast of the kykNET drama Spoorloos for its third installment, Steynhof as Adri von Tonder. She had a recurring role as Alice Band in the BBC America adaptation of Terry Pratchett's The Watch and played Jackie in the Slumber Party Massacre remake.

Filmography

Film

Television

Music videos

Stage

Awards and nominations

References

External links

Jane de Wet at TVSA

Living people
21st-century South African actresses
People from Somerset West
South African female dancers
South African film actresses
South African stage actresses
South African television actresses
Stellenbosch University alumni
Year of birth missing (living people)